The Serie B 1990–91 was the fifty-ninth tournament of this competition played in Italy since its creation.

Teams
Modena, Lucchese, Taranto and Salernitana had been promoted from Serie C, while Udinese, Verona, Cremonese and Ascoli had been relegated from Serie A.

Final classification

Results

Relegation tie-breaker

Salernitana relegated to Serie C1.

Footnotes

References and sources
Almanacco Illustrato del Calcio - La Storia 1898-2004, Panini Edizioni, Modena, September 2005

Serie B seasons
2
Italy